The Old Curiosity Shop is a 1914 British silent drama film directed by Thomas Bentley and starring Mai Deacon, Warwick Buckland and Alma Taylor. It was based on the 1841 novel The Old Curiosity Shop by Charles Dickens, and was the first of three film adaptations of the story by Bentley. It was made by the Hepworth Company, the leading British film studio before the First World War.

Cast
 Mai Deacon as Little Nell
 Warwick Buckland as Grandfather Trent
 E. Felton as Quilp
 Alma Taylor as Mrs. Quilp
 Jamie Darling as The Single Gentleman
 Willie West as Dick Swiveller
 Billy Rex as Tom Codlin
 S. May as Sampson Brass
 Bert Stowe as Short
 Sydney Locklynne as Jerry
 Moya Nugent as Marchioness
 R. Phillips as Mrs. Jarley

Bibliography
 Giddings, Robert & Sheen, Erica. From Page To Screen: Adaptations of the Classic Novel . Manchester University Press, 5 May 2000
 Mee, John. The Cambridge Introduction to Charles Dickens. Cambridge University Press, 2010.

External links

1914 films
1910s historical drama films
British historical drama films
1910s English-language films
Films directed by Thomas Bentley
British silent feature films
Films based on The Old Curiosity Shop
Films set in England
Films set in London
Films set in the 1840s
Hepworth Pictures films
British black-and-white films
1914 drama films
Silent drama films
1910s British films